Hunkemöller is a global, omnichannel retailer specialising in lingerie and related products. The company was founded in 1886 in Amsterdam as a speciality shop for corsets. Today, it is a brand with more than 7,400 employees in 19 countries. Hunkemöller is a market leader in The Netherlands, Belgium, Denmark, and Germany.

History
Wilhelm Hunkemöller and his wife Josephina Lexis founded the company in 1886 as a special shop for corsets and bustles in Amsterdam. In the early years, they produced products in their own factory. In the following years, the family-owned business expanded and opened stores in Amsterdam, Rotterdam and Utrecht. In 1974 the company was acquired by Vendex subsidiary Confendex B.V., a subsidiary company of Vroom & Dreesman B.V. At this point, the company name was changed from “Hunkemöller Lexis” to simply “Hunkemöller”.
In 1977 the company expanded to Belgium and ten years later to Germany. Today, Hunkemöller has stores throughout Europe and franchise partner stores in the Middle East. In 2003 online operations began in The Netherlands.

Notable people
In August 2016, the Dutch supermodel Doutzen Kroes became Hunkemöller's lead brand ambassador. Previously, the model and tv personality Sylvie Meis was the face of the company. In 2021 US actor and media star Lucy Hale launched a collaboration with the brand.

Collections
Hunkemöller sells lingerie, shapewear, nightwear, loungewear, swimwear, sports clothing, hosiery, fragrance and accessories. Hunkemöller structures its product offer via a range of sub-brands: HKMX (sports collection), Private collection (seductive lingerie), Noir (premium lingerie and swimwear), P.O.P (aimed at Generation Z), Freedom (wire free collection), Bra Solutions (bra accessories) and Always Sexy (everyday lingerie). In addition, the brand creates regular collaborative influencer collections. In the autumn of 2021 the brand launched its first Lucy Hale collection.

Company structure
Hunkemöller operates a omni-channel model: own-operated physical stores, outlets (for clearance), shop-in-shops, digital channels and international franchise units. Hunkemöller began its franchise program in 1979.

The company was acquired by The Carlyle Group in early 2016. Since the end of 2010 the company belonged to PAI Partners, a European private equity group. Before it was part of Maxeda, a retail business from the Netherlands who in 2009 appointed the current CEO Philip Mountford to lead a period of expansion and transformation. Hunkemöller’s headquarters is in Hilversum, the Netherlands. In 2021 the business operated 900 physical stores, 19 international webshops, has around 7,400 employees and 4.7m active members.

In October 2021, The Carlyle Group shared its intention for the sale of the business. In October 2021 the CEO, Philip Mountford stated the brand's worth as €1bn (£855.45m).

Diversity & Inclusion

The brand's diversity and inclusion activities include the appointment of Loiza Lamers as a brand influencer and supporting the European Network Against Racism.

Charitable support

 Pink Ribbon - a charity that supports women in the fight against breast cancer.
 CEMBA - a circular economy social enterprise that reuses fashion waste products to create mattresses for flood refugees.
 NewLife - an organisation that provides support to terminally ill and disabled children

Awards
 2017-2021: 'Top Employer'. 
 2017: 'Best European Retailer of the year' (Lingerie & Underwear) 
 2017: Philip Mountford (CEO) 'Best Retail Executive'.
 2017: 'Webshop Award'.
 2016 'Cross Channel Award Europe'.
 2016: RETA (Retail Technology Award) in the category Best Enterprise Solution
 2015: 'Webshop Award Europe' and 'Cross Channel Award Europe'.
 2015: German 'Retailer of the Year'.
 2015: VROUW Award Telegraaf (NL) for the best lingerie collection with focus on the Sylvie Collection London.
 2015: Women’s Health Germany Award for 'Best Lingerie Brand'.
 2015: RETA (Retail Technology Award) in the category best customer experience with the Flagship Düsseldorf, Germany 
 2014: Mercuriusprijs for 'Best Store Concept' in Belgium with the Meir Flagship store. 
 2014: 'Best Lingerie Chain' in the Netherlands.
 2013: 'Best Lingerie Chain' in Belgium, Germany, and Austria.

References

External links 
Hunkemöller Website UK

Lingerie retailers
Clothing companies established in 1886
Clothing companies of the Netherlands
Companies based in North Holland
Organisations based in Hilversum